Ahren Warner (born 1986) is a British poet.

Background
Ahren Warner is a poet and artist. He has published four books of poetry, most recently Hello. Your promise has been extracted (Bloodaxe, 2017), a collection of poems and photographs, and The sea is spread and cleaved and furled (Prototype, 2020), a book-length sequence of poems and moving-image work. His work has received numerous awards, including three Poetry Book Society Recommendations and an Arts Foundation Fellowship. He was also selected for Bloomberg New Contemporaries 2020.

Warner's poems appear in several major anthologies, including London: A History in Verse (Harvard University Press, 2012) and Identity Parade: New British and Irish Poets (Bloodaxe, 2010). From 2013 to 2019, he was the Poetry Editor of ''Poetry London.

References

External links
 Official Page

Living people
1986 births
21st-century British poets
British male poets
21st-century British male writers